The BYD L3 (or BYD F5 and BYD New F3 in Latin America) is a compact car manufactured by BYD Co., Ltd., a Chinese automobile manufacturer based in Shenzhen, Guangdong Province.

Overview
The BYD L3 is essentially an evolution of the  BYD F3. The BYD L3 is also commercialized in Chile, Uruguay and other Latin America countries with the name of New F3.

Engine choices are a 1.5 or 1.8 litre engine with a 5 speed manual and 6 speed dual clutch available on the 1.5 models while the 1.8 models are paired with a CVT gearbox.

References

L3
Cars introduced in 2010